The Nokia N810 Internet tablet is an Internet appliance from Nokia, announced on 17 October 2007 at the Web 2.0 Summit in San Francisco.  Despite Nokia's strong association with cellular products, the N810, like preceding tablets produced by Nokia, was not a phone, but instead allowed the user to browse the Internet and communicate using Wi-Fi networks or with a mobile phone via Bluetooth.  It built on the hardware and software of the Nokia N800 with some features added and some removed.

The Nokia N810 featured the Maemo Linux distribution operating system based on Maemo 4.0, which featured MicroB (a Mozilla-based mobile browser), a GPS navigation application, new media player, and a refreshed interface.

Major changes from the N800 
The Nokia N810 had much in common with the N800 and Internet Tablet OS 2008 operated on both, but there were some significant differences between the two. Here are the new features in the Nokia N810:
 Sliding, backlit keyboard
 Front-facing webcam (replacing pop-out rotating device)
 Ambient Light Sensor
 Integrated GPS
 2 GB integrated internal storage
 MiniSDHC card slot (replacing two full-size SDHC slots, one internal, one external) | Maximum: 32GB
 Sunlight readable transflective display
 USB Micro-AB receptacle (replacing a USB Mini-B receptacle)
 No longer has an FM tuner

Nokia N810 WiMAX Edition 
On 1 April 2008, Nokia announced a WiMAX equipped version of the N810 called the "N810 WiMAX Edition". This device was to be identical in specifications to the original N810 but included a WiMAX radio for use initially on Sprint's Xohm network, and featured a color change from Light Gray or dark blue to Black, as well as a larger case-back bulge to accommodate an antenna that was more efficient at the required bands.

The production of the Wimax Edition of the Nokia N810 ended in January 2009.

Maemo 

The N810, like all Nokia Internet Tablets, ran Maemo, which was similar to many handheld operating systems, and provided a "Home" screen – the central point from which all applications and settings were accessed. The Home screen was divided into areas for launching applications, a menu bar, and a large customisable area that could display information such as an RSS reader, Internet radio player, and Google search box for example. Maemo was a modified version of Debian Linux.

The N810 was bundled with several applications including the Mozilla-based MicroB browser, Adobe Flash, Gizmo, and Skype.

Mobile Firefox "Fennec" was also made available for N810, and promised to make users "forget about the clunky, stripped-down mobile Web you're used to". Installation added the Mozilla repository to the Application Manager, allowing automatic notification of updates.

See also
 Mobile Internet Device
 Nokia 770
 Nokia N800
 Nokia N900
 Nokia Lumia 2520

References

External links
 Nokia N810 WiMAX Edition
 Nokia N810 UK Edition
 Online article (1 July 2008) from Dr. Dobb's Journal website reviewing the Nokia N810 WiMAX Edition

Nokia Internet tablets
Mobile computers
Linux-based devices
Nokia Nseries

de:Nokia Internet Tablet#Nokia N810